Thomas Rockliff (born 22 February 1990) is a former professional Australian rules footballer who played for the Port Adelaide Football Club and previously played for the Brisbane Lions Football Club for 154 games between 2009 and 2017. In 2008 Rockliff, a medium-sized, smart and creative forward, was the leading goalkicker in the TAC Cup with 59 goals and won the Murray Bushrangers' best and fairest award, but was overlooked in the main draft. He was, however, drafted by the Brisbane Lions with the fifth selection in the 2009 pre-season draft. He served as the captain of the Brisbane Lions in 2015 and 2016.

AFL career

Brisbane Lions (2009–2017)
Rockliff made his AFL debut in round 18, 2009 against Collingwood, which was the only match he played that season. He recorded five possessions as Brisbane lost by 40 points.

In 2010, Rockliff forced his way back into the senior Brisbane Lions side in round 3, 2010 where he has since featured predominantly in the midfield rotation. He received an AFL Rising Star nomination in round 13, 2010 and despite being heavily favoured to win the award, he finished third behind winner Dan Hannebery and Tom Scully in the end of year voting.

For the 2011 season with the Lions, who finished 15th on the ladder after only managing four wins, Rockliff averaged 27.7 disposals, 5.6 marks and 5.4 tackles per game. Rockliff was rewarded by winning the club's best and fairest award over favourite Simon Black, who also had a strong season.

For the 2013 season, Rockliff averaged 27.3 disposals and recording 30 more disposals 9 times. Rockliff also finished equal fifth in the Brownlow Medal count, polling 21 votes.

In 2014, Rockliff established himself as one of the elite midfielders of the competition, averaging a league-high 32.7 disposals and 9.1 tackles a game and recording 40 or more disposals five times. In round 18 in the Q-Clash against Gold Coast, Rockliff gathered a career-high 47 disposals (31 kicks and 16 handballs) as well as 10 tackles. Rockliff was awarded his second Merrett-Murray Medal as Brisbane's best and fairest player. Rockliff was also selected in the 2014 All-Australian Team on the Interchange after his remarkable season that was recognised.

In January 2015, it was announced that Rockliff would become the next captain of the Brisbane Lions, succeeding Jed Adcock. He lasted two years in the role and was succeeded by Dayne Beams in 2017. Following the end of the 2017 season, Rockliff began seeking a contract away from Brisbane.

Port Adelaide (2018–2021)
Rockliff joined  as a restricted free agent during the 2017 trade period after Brisbane elected not to match Port Adelaide's contract offer. He announced his immediate retirement on August 8, 2021, citing injuries.

Statistics
 Statistics are correct to the end of the 2017 season

|-
|- style="background-color: #EAEAEA"
! scope="row" style="text-align:center" | 2009
|style="text-align:center;"|
| 38 || 1 || 0 || 0 || 3 || 2 || 5 || 3 || 1 || 0.0 || 0.0 || 3.0 || 2.0 || 5.0 || 3.0 || 1.0
|-
! scope="row" style="text-align:center" | 2010
|style="text-align:center;"|
| 38 || 19 || 4 || 5 || 220 || 214 || 434 || 103 || 64 || 0.2 || 0.3 || 11.6 || 11.3 || 22.8 || 5.4 || 3.4
|- style="background-color: #EAEAEA"
! scope="row" style="text-align:center" | 2011
|style="text-align:center;"|
| 38 || 20 || 12 || 10 || 310 || 244 || 554 || 111 || 108 || 0.6 || 0.5 || 15.5 || 12.2 || 27.7 || 5.6 || 5.4
|-
! scope="row" style="text-align:center" | 2012
|style="text-align:center;"|
| 38 || 22 || 18 || 17 || 280 || 256 || 536 || 87 || 95 || 0.8 || 0.8 || 12.7 || 11.6 || 24.4 || 4.0 || 4.3
|- style="background-color: #EAEAEA"
! scope="row" style="text-align:center" | 2013
|style="text-align:center;"|
| 38 || 21 || 7 || 8 || 291 || 284 || 575 || 95 || 108 || 0.3 || 0.4 || 13.9 || 13.5 || 27.4 || 4.5 || 5.1
|-
! scope="row" style="text-align:center" | 2014
|style="text-align:center;"|
| 38 || 18 || 10 || 3 || 309 || 280 || 589 || 96 || 163 || 0.6 || 0.2 || 17.2 || 15.5 || bgcolor="DD6E81"| 32.7|| 5.3 || bgcolor="DD6E81"| 9.1
|- style="background-color: #EAEAEA"
! scope="row" style="text-align:center" | 2015
|style="text-align:center;"|
| 38 || 16 || 5 || 3 || 174 || 220 || 394 || 71 || 129 || 0.3 || 0.2 || 10.9 || 13.8 || 24.6 || 4.4 || 8.1
|-
! scope="row" style="text-align:center" | 2016
|style="text-align:center;"|
| 38 || 17 || 15 || 3 || 243 || 265 || 508 || 67 || 117 || 0.9 || 0.2 || 14.3 || 15.6 || 29.9 || 3.9 || 6.9
|-style="background-color: #EAEAEA"
! scope="row" style="text-align:center" | 2017
|style="text-align:center;"|
| 38 || 20 || 16 || 5 || 268 || 212 || 480 || 106 || 117 || 0.8 || 0.3 || 13.4 || 10.6 || 24.0 || 5.3 || 5.9
|- class="sortbottom"
! colspan=3| Career
! 154
! 87
! 54
! 2098
! 1977
! 4075
! 739
! 902
! 0.6
! 0.4
! 13.6
! 12.8
! 26.5
! 4.8
! 5.9
|}

Honours and achievements

Team
NAB Cup (Brisbane Lions): 2013

Individual
Merrett–Murray Medal (Brisbane Best & Fairest): 2011, 2014
All-Australian: 2014
Marcus Ashcroft Medal: 2012 (Round 4)
AFL Rising Star Nominee: 2010 (Round 13)
Australian Representative Honours in International Rules Football: 2014, 2015

Notes

External links

1990 births
Australian rules footballers from Victoria (Australia)
Brisbane Lions players
Murray Bushrangers players
Merrett–Murray Medal winners
All-Australians (AFL)
Living people
Brisbane Lions captains
Australia international rules football team players
Port Adelaide Football Club players
People from Benalla